Servantes iz Malog Mista is a Croatian film directed by Daniel Marušić and written by Miljenko Smoje, starring Ivica Vidović, Boris Dvornik, Karlo Bulić, Asja Kisić and Zvonko Lepetić. It was released in 1982.

External links
 

1982 films
Croatian comedy films
1980s Croatian-language films
Yugoslav comedy films